The AWB Vincent Literary Award is a literary award presented annually by The Ireland Funds. It is named after Billy Vincent, the former director of the organisation, who established the award.

Recipients
 2018 – Anne Enright
 2017 – Conor McPherson
 2016 – Emma Donoghue
 2015 – Fergal Keane
 2014 – Leontia Flynn
 2013 – Roddy Doyle
 2012 – Seamus Heaney (Lifetime Achievement)
 2011 – Colum McCann
 2010 – Colm Toibin
 2008 – David Park
 2007 – Cathal Ó Searcaigh
 2006 – Eugene McCabe
 2005 – William Trevor
 2004 – Paul Muldoon
 2003 – Marina Carr
 2002 – Dermot Healy
 2001 – Tom MacIntyre
 2000 – Edna O’Brien
 1999 – Brendan Kennelly
 1998 – Medbh McGuckian
 1997 – Sebastian Barry
 1996 – Michael Longley
 1995 – John Montague
 1994 – Evan Boland
 1993 – Bryan McMahon
 1992 – Frank McGuinness
 1991 – Nuala Ni Dhomhnaill
 1990 – Michael Hartnett
 1989 – Seamus Deane
 1988 – John B. Keane
 1987 – Derek Mahon
 1986 – Joint: Sean O’Faolain & Hubert Butler
 1985 – John McGahern
 1984 – Thomas McCarthy
 1983 – Richard Murphy
 1982 – Michael McLaverty
 1981 – Brian Friel
 1980 – Benedict Kiely
 1979 – Mary Lavin
 1978 – Paul Smith
 1977 – Aidan Higgins
 1976 – Dervla Murphy
 1975 – John Banville
 1974 – Thomas Kilroy
 1973 – Seamus Heaney
 1972 – Austin Clarke

References

Irish literary awards